Atractaspis irregularis, or the variable burrowing asp, is a species of venomous snake in the family Atractaspididae. 
It is found in Africa.

Description
Atractaspis irregularis is completely dark brown or black. The snout is very short and rounded. The portion of the rostral visible from above measures ⅔ to ¾ of its distance from the frontal. The frontal is as long as it is broad, and much longer than its distance from the end of the snout. The dorsal scales are in 25 or 27 rows, with ventral scales 220–257; anal divided; subcaudals 22–28, and divided.

References

Reinhardt, J.T. 1843. Beskrivelse af nogle nye Slangearter. Dansk. Vidensk. Selsk. Afhandl. Skrift. 10:233-279, pl. iii, figs. 1–3.

Atractaspididae
Reptiles described in 1843